The Way It Is is a topical news spoof show which ran for five series, each of eight shows, on BBC Radio 4 between 1998 and 2001.  A one-off TV version was broadcast on BBC One in 2000.  The programme is presented by fictional newsreaders Richard Richard (played by Simon Evans) and Lolly Swain (Tracy-Ann Oberman, sometimes replaced by Fiona Allen when Oberman was unavailable).
Regular characters include the hapless on-the-spot reporter James Gravadlax, who resorts to claiming "Scenes of terrible devastation " wherever he happens to be, Prince William fixated royal watcher Quentin Rumpleteazer, Jackie Trent, always posted outside 10 Downing Street no matter where the real story is and Finnish correspondent Pauli Hikillo who invariably replies to any question about the latest trends in Finland by shivering and saying how cold it is there, mad scientist Dr Benjamin Hardstaff who solves all problems using his trusty Sinclair ZX81 computer and many others.

References 

 Natalie Piper's CV
 Simon Evans

External links 
 BBC Guide to Comedy review of the TV episode
 Episode guide
 IMDB entry
 Entry at radiohaha

1998 radio programme debuts
BBC Radio comedy programmes
British satirical radio programmes
Parody radio series
Satirical radio programmes